Siedlce Voivodeship was a unit of administrative division and local government in Poland in the years 1975–1998, superseded by Masovian Voivodeship and Lublin Voivodeship. Its capital city was Siedlce.

Major cities and towns (population in 1995)
 Siedlce (74,100)
 Mińsk Mazowiecki (35,000)
 Łuków (32,000)

See also
 Voivodeships of Poland

Former voivodeships of Poland (1975–1998)
History of Lublin Voivodeship
History of Masovian Voivodeship